Bev Birklid is an American curler.

At the national level, she is a United States women's champion curler (1985).

Teams

Women's

Mixed

References

External links
 

Living people
American female curlers
American curling champions
Year of birth missing (living people)
Place of birth missing (living people)